Jason Brian Kennedy (born 11 September 1986) is an English professional footballer who plays as a midfielder for Marske United.

In his 12-year-long playing career, Kennedy spent most of his career with Rochdale with whom he signed in 2009, going on to appear in 177 official games. Apart from Rochdale, Kennedy has previously played for Middlesbrough, Darlington, and has had loan spells with Boston United, and Bury. In 2013, he signed for Bradford City.

Club career

Middlesbrough
Kennedy started his career at Middlesbrough. He made his debut for the North East of England club in the 2004–05 season, in a game against Fulham. He made six appearances, four of which were as substitute, in 2005–06, and participated in Middlesbrough's UEFA Cup run in the season against Litex Lovech, playing the full game.

Kennedy was handed a two-year contract in 2005 by manager Steve McClaren. He joined Scottish Football League club Livingston in August 2007 on a six-month loan deal.

Darlington
He made another loan move in 2008, this time to League Two side Darlington. On 10 May 2008, Kennedy scored the first goal in the League Two play-off semi-final first leg between Darlington and Rochdale. Darlington went on to win the match 2–1. However, in the second leg he missed his kick in a penalty shoot-out, sending Rochdale through to the play-off final. On 30 May 2008 Kennedy signed a two-year permanent deal with Darlington.

Rochdale
On 20 May 2009 Kennedy signed a two-year deal with Rochdale. He scored his first goal for the club on 28 August 2010 in a 3–1 win against Brentford, but was sent-off as celebrating his goal with the fans earned him a second yellow card. He followed these up with goals against MK Dons, Huddersfield Town and Charlton Athletic and ended the season with 4 goals. He played his final game for the club on 27 April 2013, helping Rochdale to a 1–0 win against Plymouth Argyle. He left having made over 200 appearances for the club during a four-year spell and was part of the 2009–10 promotion winning team.

Bradford City

On 2 July 2013, Kennedy signed for Bradford City on a free transfer following the expiry of his contract, on a two-year deal. He had almost signed for the club during the previous transfer window, and rejected the chance to stay at Rochdale as well as an offer from Hartlepool United to sign with The Bantams. He made his league debut on 5 October in a 2–0 win away to Walsall.

Rochdale Return

On 24 January, Kennedy moved to Rochdale on loan until the end of the 2013–14 season.

Carlisle United
On 12 March 2015, Kennedy completed a one-month loan deal to League Two club Carlisle United. He made a bright start to his Carlisle career, scoring his first goal on his second start for the Blues, a 2–0 away victory over Northampton.

In May 2015 it was announced Kennedy would leave Bradford City at the end of the season.
Kennedy returned to Carlisle the same week signing a permanent two-year deal 

He was released by Carlisle at the end of the 2018–19 season.

Hartlepool United
Following a successful trial, Kennedy signed for Hartlepool United on 18 July 2019.

Spennymoor Town

Kennedy signed for National League North side Spennymoor Town on loan till the end of the season

Kennedy became a player-coach at Spennymoor in May 2021.

On 11 January 2022, Kennedy joined Northern Premier League Division One East side Marske United on a two-month loan deal.

Marske United

On 25 February 2022, Kennedy joined Northern Premier League Division One East side Marske United on a permanent deal.

Career statistics

Honours
Middlesbrough
FA Youth Cup: 2003–04
UEFA Cup runner-up: 2005–06

Rochdale
League Two promotion: 2009–10, 2013–14

References

External links

1986 births
Living people
English footballers
Middlesbrough F.C. players
Boston United F.C. players
Bury F.C. players
Livingston F.C. players
Darlington F.C. players
Rochdale A.F.C. players
Bradford City A.F.C. players
Carlisle United F.C. players
Hartlepool United F.C. players
Spennymoor Town F.C. players
Marske United F.C. players
Premier League players
English Football League players
Scottish Football League players
National League (English football) players
Northern Premier League players
Association football midfielders